Chain lightning may refer to:

 angular, zigzag, forked, or bead lightning 
XP-58 Chain Lightning, an American World War II fighter airplane
Chain Lightning (1922 film), a silent melodrama
Chain Lightning (1927 film), an American Western
Chain Lightning (1950 film), an aviation film starring Humphrey Bogart
Chain Lightning (album), by Don McLean
"Chain Lightning", a Steely Dan song from the album Katy Lied
"Chain Lightnin'", .38 Special's song from Special Forces
"Chain Lightning", a song from Rush's Presto
"Chain Lightning", a song from Bruce Springsteen's 2015 box set The Ties That Bind: The River Collection
Chain Lightning, an enemy of DC Comics' Captain Marvel